Chortoglyphidae is a family of mites belonging to the order Sarcoptiformes.

Genera:
 Alabidopus Fain, 1967
 Aplodontopus Fain, 1967
 Chortoglyphus Berlese, 1884

References 

Acari